The Pathani (Kumaoni: पथनी) are an ethnic group of the Attigoan and Kamsyar region of Gangolihat tehsil Pithoragarh district of the Kumaon Himalayas of the Indian state of Uttarakhand.

Pathani people are members of a hill raja clan that migrated from Pathankot, Nurpur in India to Bhaaloaagar and then to their current location in Uttarakhand in the early 16th century. Atkinson described them as the groups holding small principalities in Kumaon at the end of Katyuri rule and the advent of the Chand dynasty in Kumaon. After a brief stint with the Chands, they were awarded a grant of the Patti of Attigaon and Kamsyar i.e. the area from Ganaigangoli to Banspatan.

Origins

Raaths
They are divided into four Raaths corresponding with descendants of the four sons of Dham Singh, the original founder of the clan.

 Padhan Raath;

 Dhuri Raath; 

 Malla Raath;

 Paar Raath;

The word Raath comes from the Sanskrit word ratha, meaning chariot, to symbolize that they are bearers of the founder's legacy.

Language and culture

Language
They speak the Gangoli dialect of Kumaoni (गंगोली कुमाँऊनी) and Hindi.

Religion
The majority of the Hindu population worships the Hindu pantheon as well as other local deities such as Golu Devta, Kaisinn, Kalbisht, and Nanda Devi, similar to other Kumaonis.

The clan's principal deity is Sem Dev (सैम देव), who is always invoked along with his brother Haru Dev (हरु देव), the divine spirit of Raja Harish of the Chands. The Dhuri Pathanis also worship Ma Haatkalik, Mata of Gangolihaat and Pardevi along with Haru-Sem.

Customs
As Kumaoni Rajputs, their customs and culture are the same as other Kumaonis. The tradition of Kumaoni Holi, Jhoda and Chanchari songs, and Jaagar the ballads of Gods, Sarau and Choliya the sword dances of Kumaon are a cherished part of their culture.

Priests
Their customary priests are the Upadhyay clan of Brahmins of Devrari Kuna.

Festivals
Their principal festivals are Harela - a harvest festival celebrated all over Kumaon Vijayadashami (बिजय दशमी) i.e. Dusshera. On this day, the victory of Lord Rama over the demon King Ravana is celebrated; It has special significance for the Rajput community as weapons are also worshipped on this day. Raksha Bandhan or Rakhi or the Shravani Purnima there signifies the day for changing the sacred thread yagnopavit. Aanthoo festival is dedicated to Shiva and his consort Mata Parvati. They also celebrate Nandashthami, which is dedicated to Ma Nanda and Ma Sunanda, the patron deities of Kumaon. They participate in the annual Baurani fair commemorating the adventures of Sem Devta with his brother Haru Dev and their nephew Golu Devta, all of whom are worshipped in the Kumaon region as gods.

See also
 Kumaon division
 Martial race

References

External links 
 The Himalayan Gazetter by E. T. Atkinson
 The History of Kumaun by B. D. Pandey
 Uma Prasad Thapliyal (2005). Uttaranchal: Historical and cultural perspectives. B.R. Pub. Corp.,. .
 Umachand Handa (2002). History of Uttaranchal. Indus Publishing. 

Rajput clans
Kumaoni Rajputs
Social groups of Uttarakhand
Indian surnames
Pithoragarh